Tikhonovo is a rural locality (a village) in Posyolok Urshelsky, Gus-Khrustalny District, Vladimir Oblast, Russia. The population was 124 as of 2010. There are 2 streets.

Geography 
Tikhonovo is located on the right bank of the Buzha River, 36 km west of Gus-Khrustalny (the district's administrative centre) by road. Yagodino is the nearest rural locality.

References 

Rural localities in Gus-Khrustalny District
Sudogodsky Uyezd